Tomasz Miśkiewicz (born 9 July 1977) is the Polish mufti of the Muzułmański Związek Religijny (Muslim Religious Union).

Biography 
Tomasz was born in Białystok in 1977 but was raised in Suchowola. From 1991 to 1993, Tomasz studied Arabic in Syria and Sudan. He continued his education further from 1993 to 2000 studying Arabic, Islamic theology, and Islamic Law at the Islamic University of Medina. In 2000 Tomasz was appointed as the imam of the Muslim Religious Union (MRU) of Białystok and then elected as a chairman for the Board of Imams of the MRU of Poland. In 2004, Tomasz became the mufti of Poland and chairman of the Highest Board of the MRU.

Decorations
In 2006, he received the Silver Cross of Merit (Poland) for the work with minorities and ecumenical work. In 2011, he received the Golden Cross of Merit for the work with the Muslim minorities and for the interfaith dialogue.

Literature
Piotr Borawski; Aleksander Dubiński (1986). Tatarzy polscy. Warsaw: Iskry. p. 270. .
Piotr Borawski (1986). Tatarzy w dawnej Rzeczypospolitej. Warsaw: Ludowa Spółdzielnia Wydawnicza. p. 317. .
Jan Tyszkiewicz (1989). Tatarzy na Litwie i w Polsce; studia z dziejów XIII-XVIII w. Warsaw: Państwowe Wydawnictwo Naukowe. p. 343. .
Ryszard Saciuk (1989). Tatarzy podlascy. Białystok: Regional Museum of Białystok. p. 36.

References

20th-century Muslim scholars of Islam
1977 births
Living people
Lipka Tatars
Polish imams
Polish Muslims
Polish Sunni Muslims
21st-century imams
Islamic University of Madinah alumni
Grand Muftis